Don't Explain is a 2011 cover album recorded by American singer Beth Hart and blues rock guitarist Joe Bonamassa.

Track listing

Charts

Weekly charts

Year-end charts

Certifications

Personnel

Musicians
 Joe Bonamassa – guitar, vocals
 Blondie Chaplin – guitar
 Anton Fig – drums, percussion
 Beth Hart – piano, vocals, liner notes
 Carmine Rojas – bass guitar
 Arlan Schierbaum – keyboards

Production
 Laura Grover – liner notes
 Jared Kvitka – engineer
 George Marino – mastering
 James McCullagh – engineer
 Vanessa Parr – engineer
 Mike Prior – photography
 Kevin Shirley – mixing, producer
 Roy Weisman – executive producer
 Ghian Wright – engineer

References

2011 albums
Beth Hart albums
Joe Bonamassa albums
Covers albums
Collaborative albums